Tallboy or Bomb, Medium Capacity, 12,000 lb was an earthquake bomb developed by the British aeronautical engineer Barnes Wallis and used by the Royal Air Force (RAF) during the Second World War.

At , it could be carried only by a modified model of the Avro Lancaster heavy bomber. It proved to be effective against large, fortified structures against which conventional bombing had proved ineffective.

History
Wallis presented his ideas for a 10-ton bomb in his 1941 paper "A Note on a Method of Attacking the Axis Powers", which showed that a very large bomb exploding deep underground next to a target would transmit the shock into the foundations of the target, particularly since shock waves are transmitted through the ground more strongly than through air.

The design and production of Tallboy was undertaken without a contract on the initiative of the Ministry, following Wallis' 1942 paper "Spherical Bomb—Surface Torpedo" and the design of the "bouncing bomb" for the Dam Busters of Operation Chastise. The RAF therefore used bombs which they had not purchased and which therefore remained the property of Vickers the manufacturer. This situation was normalised once the weapon’s capabilities were established.

The last of the Kriegsmarine's Bismarck-class battleships, the Tirpitz, was sunk by an air attack using Tallboys in Operation Catechism.

Design
Most large Allied, particularly British, Second World War aircraft bombs (blockbuster bombs) had very thin skins to maximize the weight of explosive that a bomber could carry. This was an improvement on the early part of the war when the explosive content of British bombs was low.

To be able to penetrate the earth (or fortified targets) without breaking apart, the casing of the Tallboy had to be strong. Each was cast in one piece of high-tensile steel that would enable it to survive the impact before detonation. At the same time, to achieve the penetration required, Wallis designed the Tallboy to be aerodynamically clean so that, when dropped from a great height, it would reach a much higher terminal velocity than traditional bomb designs.

Initially, the bomb had a tendency to tumble and the tail was modified; the fins were given a slight twist so that the bomb spun as it fell. The gyroscopic effect thus generated stopped the pitching and yawing, improving aerodynamics and accuracy.

The weight of the Tallboy (approximately ) and the high altitude required of the bombing aircraft meant that the Avro Lancasters used had to be specially adapted. Armour plating and even defensive armament were removed to reduce weight, and the bomb-bay doors had to be adapted.

No. 617 Squadron were trained on the Stabilizing Automatic Bomb Sight (SABS). Corrections had to be made for temperature, wind speed and other factors. The sight was effective only if the target could be clearly identified. Several missions were cancelled or unsuccessful because of this limitation.

For use on underground targets, the bomb was fitted with three separate inertia No. 58 Mark I Tail Pistols (firing mechanisms). These triggered detonation after a pre-set delay, which gave the bomb sufficient time to penetrate the target before exploding. Depending on mission requirements, the time delay could be set to 30 seconds or 30 minutes after impact.

To guarantee detonation, three Type 47 long delay fuzes were fitted inside the rear of the bomb. This dramatically improved reliability of the weapon; even if two of the fuzes failed, the third would trigger detonation. At least 2 Tallboys failed to explode, one during the second attack on the Sorpe dam; it was found during repairs in late 1958 when the reservoir was emptied, and a second was found in Świnoujście in Poland (formerly Swinemünde) in 2020. This second bomb detonated in October 2020 while being remotely defused.

The bomb was aimed at the target during an operation and proved capable of penetrating deep into hardened reinforced concrete when it hit. This, however, was not the primary intention of Barnes Wallis's design. The bomb was designed to make impact close to the target, penetrate the soil or rock beneath or around the target, and then detonate, transferring all of its energy into the structure, or creating a camouflet (cavern or crater) into which the target would fall.

This 'earthquake' effect caused more damage than even a direct hit that penetrated the armour of a target, since even a burst inside a bunker would only damage the surroundings, with the blast dissipating rapidly through the air. An earthquake impact shook the whole target and caused structural damage to all parts of it, making repair uneconomic. The attack reports below should be considered with this in mind.

An alternative technique was to arrange detonation depth so that the crater broke the surface—useful for attacking railway marshalling yards and similar targets. Such a huge hole was time-consuming to fill; multiple trucks and bulldozers could not be fitted around the periphery of the hole to speed the process.

Manufacturing
Tallboys were largely hand-made, requiring much labour during each manufacturing stage. The materials used were costly, with precise engineering requirements in casting and machining. To increase penetrative power, a large, specially hardened, steel plug had to be precisely machined and mated to a recess in the nose of the bomb. The ogive had to be perfectly symmetrical to ensure optimum aerodynamic performance. This was no easy task when manipulating a bomb casing with the size and weight of a Tallboy.

The Torpex filling was poured by hand into the base of the upturned casing after melting it in "kettles". The final stage of explosive filling required that a one-inch layer of pure TNT be poured over the Torpex filling, followed by sealing the base with a  layer of woodmeal-wax composite with three cylindrical recesses fitted with the explosive boosters and into which three chemical time-fuses were inserted when the bomb was armed.

Tallboys were not considered expendable, and if not used on a raid were to be brought back to base rather than safely jettisoned into the sea.  The value of the weapon offset the additional risk to the aircrew. Given their high unit cost, Tallboys were used exclusively against high-value strategic targets that could not be destroyed by other means. When it was found that the Lancaster could be modified to carry a bomb larger than the Tallboy, Wallis produced the even larger Grand Slam bomb.

Operations

June – August 1944

 Saumur rail tunnel The sole operational north-south route on the Loire. Nineteen Tallboy-equipped and six conventionally equipped Lancasters of 617 Squadron attacked on the night of 8/9 June 1944. 617 Squadron were guided on to the target by 83 Squadron Pathfinder Force. No aircraft were lost during the raid.

Operation Crossbow

Crossbow was the code name for measures to counter the German V-1 flying bomb ("buzz bomb" or "doodlebug") and V-2 rocket weapons. Tallboys were used by the British to destroy several missile sites.

19 June 1944 – Watten
 The nearest Tallboy dropped by 617 Squadron landed  from the target, a heavily fortified V-2 launch site under construction The bunker was rendered useless.

24 June 1944  – Wizernes
 The target was a V-2 assembly and launch site linked with the Watten site. Several Tallboy hits undermined the foundations but did not penetrate the dome. The bunker was abandoned.

25 June 1944 – Siracourt V-1 bunker
 Lancasters of 617 Squadron scored three direct hits with Tallboys without loss.

4 July 1944 – Saint-Leu-d'Esserent
 617 Squadron used seventeen Lancasters with Tallboys, supported by one Mosquito and one Mustang, in an attempt to collapse the limestone roof of the caves used as storage depots. Aircraft from No 5 Group followed up with  bombs.

6 July 1944 – Mimoyecques

 Attack on V-weapon targets. Damage was unknown at the time, and efforts continued. In September, allied ground forces found galleries blocked with earth and debris where Tallboys had hit one of the shafts. The V-weapon was revealed to be the V-3 cannon.

17 July 1944 – Wizernes
 16 Lancasters, led by a Mosquito and a Mustang,  bombed Wizernes – three Lancasters managed to drop Tallboys (one caused the dome to shift out of alignment, two others blocked the entrance).

27 July 1944 – Watten
 One Tallboy hit the target but did not penetrate the structure.

31 July 1944 – Rilly La Montagne
 Both ends of the railway tunnel were collapsed by Tallboys dropped by 617 Squadron.

Sorties against German dockyards
Shipping in the English Channel and the Atlantic Ocean were threatened by U-boats and E-boats stationed in France. U-boat docks were protected against conventional aerial bombardment by thick concrete roofs.

14 June 1944 – Le Havre
 Part of the first massive RAF daylight raid since the end of May 1943, two waves attacked E-boat facilities at Le Havre: No 1 Group first, No 3 Group second. Just before the first wave, 22 Lancasters of 617 Squadron and 3 Mosquito marker aircraft attacked, several hits were scored on the pens, one bomb penetrated the roof.

15 June 1944 – Boulogne harbour
 297 aircraft: 155 Lancasters, 130 Halifaxes, 12 Mosquitos, of Nos 1, 4, 5, 6 and 8 Groups attacked Boulogne harbour. One Halifax was lost. A French report described the great destruction as the worst raid on Boulogne. During the raid 22 Lancasters of No. 617 squadron bombed the E-boat pens with Tallboys. Due to cloud cover ten planes returned to base with their bombs. However, the raid was considered a success as the E-boats retired to IJmuiden on the Dutch coast, where they were better protected but less able to interfere with Allied naval traffic supporting the Normandy invasion.

5 August 1944 – Brest
 15 Lancasters of 617 Squadron attacked the U-boat pens at Brest and scored six direct hits with Tallboys, penetrating the concrete roofs. One Lancaster was shot down by flak. Subsequent attempts to reinforce other sites with even thicker concrete diverted resources from other projects.

6 August 1944 – Keroman
 Flight Lieutenant Thomas Clifford Iveson dropped one Tallboy, bomb failed to penetrate base.

7 August 1944 – Lorient
 The planned Tallboy mission against the U-boat pens was cancelled, Instead Keroman Submarine Base was the primary target.

8 August 1944 – La Pallice
 Flight Lieutenant Thomas Iveson dropped one Tallboy.

28 August 1944 – IJmuiden
 Iveson dropped one Tallboy.

September – November 1944
23/24 September 1944 – Dortmund-Ems Canal near Ladbergen, north of Münster
 During the night attack 617 Squadron scored six direct hits with Tallboys.

7 October 1944 – Kembs Dam north of Basle
 The dam waters could have been kept in reserve to flood the area of a US advance. The Dambusters destroyed the lock gates with Tallboys dropped at low level, releasing the stored water.

15 October 1944 – Sorpe dam
 Target of the original Dambusters raid survived a second attack by 9 Squadron (617 Squadron did not participate in this raid). The Tallboy bombs were seen to hit the dam but did not breach it.

Raids on Tirpitz
The German battleship Tirpitz was a threat against convoys sailing to and from the Soviet Union.

15 September 1944 – (Operation Paravane)
 One Tallboy hit near the bow of the Tirpitz, passing through the foredeck and hull, and exploded in the water on the starboard side of her bow. The blast wrecked the bow, and left the battleship's forward compartments flooded with 2,000 tons of water. The explosions of several other Tallboys in the water near Tirpitz also buckled some of her hull plates and bulkheads. Five men were killed and fifteen wounded. Tirpitz was rendered unseaworthy and the damage was assessed as needing nine months' worth of work to repair, but this was considered unfeasible so the battleship was relegated to a floating artillery battery.

29 October 1944 – (Operation Obviate)
 Due to cloud coming in just before the attack, 32 bombs were dropped "blind". No direct hits were scored but one near miss bent a propeller shaft.

12 November 1944 – (Operation Catechism)
 In the final operation the Tirpitz was sunk by three Tallboys hits, and several others fell close by. Several bombs landed within the anti-torpedo net barrier and caused significant cratering of the seabed, removing much of the sandbank that had been constructed to prevent the ship from capsizing. One bomb penetrated the ship's deck between turrets Anton and Bruno but failed to explode. A second hit amidships between the aircraft catapult and the funnel, completely destroying the entire section of belt armour abreast of the bomb hit and blowing a very large hole in the ship's side and bottom, causing significant flooding and a port list to 60 degrees. A third bomb struck the ship on the port side of turret Caesar, eventually leading to a magazine explosion that caused the ship to capsize.

December 1944 – April 1945

Bombing of U-boat pens, December 1944 – April 1945

15 December 1944 – IJmuiden on the Dutch coast,
 617 Squadron attacked E-boat pens with Tallboys. A smoke-screen hindered the bombing, and the results went unseen.

12 January 1945 – Bergen
 32 Lancasters and one Mosquito of Nos 9 and 617 Squadrons attacked U-boat pens and shipping in Bergen harbour. Three Lancasters of 617 Squadron and one from 9 Squadron were lost; the Germans told the local people that 11 bombers had been shot down. A local report said that three Tallboys penetrated the  roof of the pens and caused severe damage to workshops, offices and stores inside".

3 February 1945 – IJmuiden & Poortershaven
 36 Lancasters of No 5 Group attacked U-boat pens at IJmuiden (9 Squadron) and Poortershaven (617 Squadron) with Tallboys. Hits were claimed on both targets without loss.

9 April 1945 – Hamburg
 617 Squadron attacked with Tallboys and Grand Slams. Some of the bombs hit their target and no aircraft were lost.

18 April 1945  – Heligoland
 969 aircraft: 617 Lancasters, 332 Halifaxes and 20 Mosquitos of all groups bombed the naval base, airfield and town "almost into crater-pitted moonscapes". Three Halifaxes were lost; the islands were evacuated the following night.

19 April 1945 – Heligoland
 36 Lancasters used Tallboy bombs against coastal positions.

8 December, 11 December 1944
 Urft Dam, ( south west of Cologne) was attacked to prevent it being used to flood the area as American troops advanced. The lip of the dam was damaged, but the Germans prevented further damage by lowering the water level.

21 December 1944 – Politz
 617 Squadron.

14 March 1945 – Bielefeld and Arnsberg viaducts
 The viaducts were attacked by 617 and 9 squadrons with Tallboys and the first Grand Slams. The Arnsberg viaduct withstood the attack but  of the Bielefeld viaduct collapsed through the 'earthquake effect' of the Grand Slams and Tallboys.

15 March 1945 – Arnsberg viaduct
 Arnsberg viaduct was attacked again by 9 Squadron. It did not collapse.
16 April 1945 – pocket battleship Lützow
 Lützow was attacked by 617 Squadron. Despite intense flak, 15 aircraft managed to bomb the target with Tallboys or with  bombs. One near miss with a Tallboy tore a large hole in the bottom of the Lützow and she settled to the bottom in shallow water. One Lancaster was shot down, the Squadron's last loss of the war. One of the bombs remained sunk near Świnoujście in the middle of main shipping Piast Canal for 74 years, unearthed during the preparatory works for deepening of the Świnoujście-Szczecin fairway in September 2019. Operations to defuse and remove it were undertaken in October 2020. It exploded during defusing, but without causing any injuries.

25 April 1945 – Berghof
 Hitler's vacation home, the Berghof, near Berchtesgaden was attacked with a mixed force that included six Lancasters of 617 Squadron dropping their last Tallboys. The bombing appeared to be accurate and effective.

Postwar
The last of the V bombers – the Handley Page Victor – was designed to be able to carry a bomb load that could include a load of two Tallboys internally, or one Grand Slam plus assorted smaller weapons.

Unexploded ordnance
In December 1958, a Tallboy was found during renovation works on the Sorpe Dam, Germany. On 6 January 1959, the bomb was defused by a German and British crew of demining officers.
In September 2019, a Tallboy bomb was found in the Piast Canal in northwest Poland near the town of Świnoujście and scheduled for defusing. The bomb had been dropped in the April 1945 attack on the Lützow, a German cruiser. In October 2020, the Tallboy wound up detonating during a deflagration operation, but there were no reported injuries to divers nor any damage to the port infrastructure from the underwater explosion.

United States use
The T-10 was an American-made version of the  Tallboy modified to use standard American components. Development was started in late 1944 and plans were made to drop them on the island strongholds of the Pacific to aid in softening their defences before amphibious assaults. No bombs were used operationally since the capitulation of Japan following the atomic bombings of Hiroshima and Nagasaki negated their need. In the late 1950s the T-10 was re-designated the M-121. During the Korean War a number of T-10s were converted to the radio-guided Tarzon bomb and were dropped by Boeing B-29 Superfortresses to destroy railroad bridges and reservoir dams.

After the Korean War ended and the B-29 and B-36 bombers were retired, the United States Air Force no longer had an aircraft that could drop the M-121, and the bombs were put in storage. Production of the T-10 ended in 1955. The B-36 was the last operational aircraft that could drop a fully assembled Tallboy type bomb in the conventional way. During the Vietnam War, some M-121s, minus their rear streamlined shrouds and tail fin assemblies, were shipped to Vietnam for Commando Vault missions where the warheads were incorporated into the BLU-82 weapons dropped by C-130s using radar control in order to clear a helicopter landing zone. The warheads were mounted on a platform and pulled by parachutes from the rear-loading ramp of C-130s. After clearing the aircraft the large extraction chutes and pallets were cut away and small triangular chutes stabilized the large warhead until impact. A  nose probe detonated the bomb at the correct stand-off distance. One of the last of the World War II Tallboy designs was dropped during a Commando Vault mission to clear a landing zone for helicopters on a ridge during the 1969 Battle of Hamburger Hill in Vietnam. The Commando Vault missions were more accurate in bomb delivery on target than the more modern B-52s.

Work still progressed on the  T-12 Cloudmaker, which could be carried by the Convair B-36A.

See also
 ASM-A-1 Tarzon
 Bunker buster
 Grand Slam

Notes

References

 
 
 
 
 
 
 
 
 
 
 
(June 1944
, July 1944
, August 1944
, September 1944
, October 1944
,November 1944
, December 1944
, January 1945
, February 1945
, March 1945
, April and May 1945)

Further reading

External links

 Barnes Wallis Trust
 A picture of a Lancaster carrying a Grand Slam
 Article about the defusing of the unexploded Tallboy in the Hamburger Abendblatt 
 "Huge Bomb Drills Into Target Before Exploding." Popular Mechanics, February 1945, p. 49.
  Tallboy at the International Bomber Command Centre Digital Archive

Anti-fortification weapons
World War II aerial bombs of the United Kingdom
Barnes Wallis
Weapons and ammunition introduced in 1944